Melissa Soligo (born February 7, 1969 in Trail, British Columbia, Canada) is a Canadian curler and curling coach, currently living in Victoria, British Columbia.

Soligo began curling at age 11. In her youth, she also played volleyball, basketball, field hockey and fastball.

She won a bronze medal at the 1992 Winter Olympics when curling was a demonstration sport.

Her competitive curling career was cut short when she was struck by an intoxicated driver while she was walking. She then made the choice to switch to coaching. Early in her career she focused on coaching junior teams in Canada. In 2002 she began coaching the South Korean curling teams where under her leadership the men's team won the Pacific Curling Championship. She has also been the national team leader of Curling Canada's wheelchair curling program, the coach of BC's wheelchair curling team and is currently a national coach, mentor coach and High Performance Director at CurlBC.

Personal life
Soligo has a bachelor of education degree with a major in physical education and geography from the University of Victoria.
Achieved her Level 5 Professional Coach Certification (one of only two in Canada who have this in curling).

Awards
Joan Mead Builder Award:  ("for her contributions to curling as a player, coach and High Performance Director at Curl BC")
British Columbia Curling Hall of Fame: 1996, together with all of the Julie Sutton 1991–1993 team.

Teams and events

Record as a coach of national teams

References

External links

 Melissa Soligo – Curling Canada Stats Archive
 Melissa Soligo | Curling Canada
 Melissa Soligo | Coaching Association of Canada
 Home of Champions - Melissa Soligo - Trail Sports History
 Four Foot Curling Camps (look at "Melissa Soligo")
 Championship Victoria curler awarded 1.1 million | PARC: Promoting Awareness of RSD and CRPS in Canada

Living people
1969 births
Sportspeople from Trail, British Columbia
Curlers from Victoria, British Columbia
Canadian women curlers
Canadian women's curling champions
Curlers at the 1992 Winter Olympics
Olympic curlers of Canada
Canadian curling coaches
University of Victoria alumni